Lee Moran (1888–1961) was an American actor.

Lee Moran may also refer to:

Lee Moran (TV personality), in Ex on the Beach
Lee Moran (American football) (born 1943), American football player and coach
Lee Moran, fictional character in Revenge